Elend may refer to:

 Elend, Saxony-Anhalt, a village at the foot of the Brocken, the highest mountain in the Harz in central Germany
 Elend (band), a French band